Jakub Łabojko (born 3 October 1997) is a Polish professional footballer who plays as a midfielder for Italian  club Brescia.

Senior career
Łabojko began his professional career with Piast Gliwice with whom he won the Silesian youth championship with. Łabojko never played for the Piast first team however, and joined Ruch Radzionków in 2016. By the next transfer window he had failed to appear for Ruch, and joined Raków Częstochowa on loan until the end of the season. After a successful loan spell Łabojko made the move to Raków permanent, playing with the team for the 2017-18 season. After making a total of 45 appearances for Raków, Łabojko moved to Śląsk Wrocław for the beginning of the 2018-19 season. He made his league debut for Śląsk coming on as a substitute in the 3-3 draw with Zagłębie Sosnowiec.

On 18 September 2020 he signed with Italian Serie B club Brescia.

On 26 January 2022 he was loaned to Cypriot First Division side AEK Larnaca until the end of the season.

References

1997 births
People from Tarnowskie Góry
Living people
Polish footballers
Poland youth international footballers
Poland under-21 international footballers
Association football midfielders
Piast Gliwice players
Ruch Radzionków players
Raków Częstochowa players
Śląsk Wrocław players
Brescia Calcio players
AEK Larnaca FC players
Ekstraklasa players
I liga players
II liga players
Serie B players
Cypriot First Division players
Polish expatriate footballers
Expatriate footballers in Italy
Expatriate footballers in Cyprus
Polish expatriate sportspeople in Italy
Polish expatriate sportspeople in Cyprus